John Murphy (born 1999) is an Irish hurler who plays for Offaly Championship club Ballinamere and at inter-county level with the Offaly senior hurling team. He usually lines out as a forward.

Career

Murphy first came to hurling prominence with the combined Ballinamere/Durrow club at juvenile and underage levels, before later joining the Ballinamere club's top adult team. He first appeared on the inter-county scene as a member of the Offaly under-17 team that won the Celtic Challenge in 2016. After also lining out with the Offaly under-20 team, Murphy was drafted onto the senior team in advance of the 2021 National Hurling League.

Career statistics

Honours

Offaly
Christy Ring Cup: 2021
National Hurling League Division 2A: 2021

References

External links
John Murphy appearance record

1999 births
Living people
Ballinamere hurlers
Offaly inter-county hurlers